The High North Alliance is an umbrella organisation of several fishing, whaling and Nordic municipal councils. The organisation objectives are, it says, "to protect the rights of whalers, sealers and fishermen to harvest renewable resources in accordance with the principle of sustainable management."

The alliance was founded in 1991 in response to calls from environmentalists to prohibit completely commercial whaling, and, from more radical groups, calls to prohibit the killing of marine mammals for any purpose. The alliance is organised by a governing committee of six members, three from Norway, and one each from the Faroe Islands, Greenland and Iceland. The alliance is funded by membership fees, and from grants from organisations such as the North Atlantic Marine Mammal Commission (founded by Norway, Iceland, Greenland, and the Faroe Islands in 1992) and the Regional Development Committee for Northern Norway.

Activities of the Alliance include lobbying the largely sympathetic Norwegian government for increases in Norway's whaling quota, promoting studies into methods of more humane whaling, lobbying the International Whaling Commission into relaxing the whaling moratorium, and responding to campaigns from anti-whaling groups such as the Whale and Dolphin Conservation Society and Greenpeace.

External links
High North Alliance homepage

Nordic organizations
Whaling in Denmark
Whaling in Iceland
Whaling in Norway
1991 establishments in Norway
1991 establishments in Iceland
1991 establishments in Denmark
Organizations established in 1991